o-Phenyl-3-iodotyramine (o-PIT) is a drug which acts as a selective agonist for the trace amine-associated receptor 1. It has reasonable selectivity for TAAR1 but relatively low potency, and is rapidly metabolised in vivo, making it less useful for research than newer ligands such as RO5166017.

References 

Thyroid
TAAR1 agonists
Phenyl compounds